The Solonechnoye mine is a large mine located in the south-eastern Russia in Primorsky Krai. Solonechnoye represents one of the largest fluorite reserves in Russia having estimated reserves of 2.8 million tonnes of ore grading 67% fluorite.

References 

Fluorite mines in Russia